The Kōfu International Open was a tournament for professional male and female tennis players on outdoor hardcourts. The event was classified as a $25,000 ITF Women's Circuit and ITF Men's Circuit tournament. It had been held in Kōfu, Japan, since 2003. In 2011, it was a $50k women's event.

Past finals

Women's singles

Women's doubles

Men's singles

Men's doubles

External links
 
 ITF search

ITF Women's World Tennis Tour
ITF World Tennis Tour
Hard court tennis tournaments
Tennis tournaments in Japan
Recurring sporting events established in 2003